Maple Spring Brook (also known as Maple Spring Branch or Maple Spring Run) is a tributary of Kitchen Creek in Luzerne County, Pennsylvania, in the United States. There is a waterfall in the stream's upper reaches and hemlock trees occur in the vicinity. The surficial geology in the area consists mainly of Wisconsinan Till, Wisconsinan Bouldery Till, wetlands, and bedrock consisting of shale and sandstone.

Course
Maple Spring Brook begins on a mountain in Fairmount Township, not far from Red Rock Mountain. It flows southeast for a short distance and enters a deep valley before turning south. The stream then turns east-southeast for a short distance before reaching its confluence with Kitchen Creek.

Geography and geology

The surficial geology in the vicinity of the lower reaches of Maple Spring Brook mainly features a glacial or resedimented till known as Wisconsinan Till. Further upstream, there is bedrock consisting of sandstone and shale. Near the headwaters, there is Wisconsinan Bouldery Till and a patch of wetland.

Watershed and biology
The stream is entirely within the United States Geological Survey quadrangle of Red Rock.

It is in the stream's upper reaches and is situated several hundred feet downstream of the Ganoga View Trail.

Its height was measured via the laser-clinometer method. There are numerous hemlock trees in the vicinity of the stream's upper reaches.

History and recreation
Maple Spring Brook was entered into the Geographic Names Information System on August 2, 1979. Its identifier in the Geographic Names Information System is 1180366.

Maple Spring Branch is in Ricketts Glen State Park. The Ganoga View Trail in Ricketts Glen State Park crosses the stream near its headwaters.

See also
Boston Run, next tributary of Kitchen Creek going downstream
Shingle Cabin Brook, next tributary of Kitchen Creek going upstream
List of rivers of Pennsylvania

References

Rivers of Luzerne County, Pennsylvania
Tributaries of Fishing Creek (North Branch Susquehanna River)
Rivers of Pennsylvania